Aurora, also known as Aurora Fountain, is an outdoor 1986 stainless steel fountain and sculpture by Ruth Asawa, installed at Bayside Plaza (188 Embarcadero) at Howard Street in San Francisco, California.

See also

 1986 in art

References

1986 establishments in California
1986 sculptures
Fountains in California
Outdoor sculptures in San Francisco
Stainless steel sculptures in the United States
Steel sculptures in California
South of Market, San Francisco